United Presbyterian Church may refer to:

Denominations
United Presbyterian Church in the United States of America (1958–1983)
United Presbyterian Church of North America (1858–1958)
United Presbyterian Church of Brazil
United Presbyterian Church of Pakistan
United Presbyterian Church (Scotland) (1847–1900)

Congregations and buildings
 United Presbyterian Church of Canehill, Arkansas
 United Presbyterian Church (Malad City, Idaho)
 United Presbyterian Church, Summerset, Scotch Ridge, Iowa
 United Presbyterian Church (Lisbon, New York)
 United Presbyterian Church and Rectory (Albany, Oregon)
 United Presbyterian Church of Shedd, Oregon
 United Presbyterian Church (Pullman, Washington)
 United Presbyterian Church, Thurso, Caithness, Scotland